The Institutes of the Lawes of England are a series of legal treatises written by Sir Edward Coke. They were first published, in stages, between 1628 and 1644. Widely recognized as a foundational document of the common law, they have been cited in over 70 cases decided by the Supreme Court of the United States, including several landmark cases. For example, in Roe v. Wade (1973), Coke's Institutes are cited as evidence that under old English common law, an abortion performed before quickening was not an indictable offence. In the much earlier case of United States v. E. C. Knight Co. (1895), Coke's Institutes are quoted at some length for their definition of monopolies. The Institutes's various reprinted editions well into the 19th century is a clear indication of the long lasting value placed on this work throughout especially the 18th century in Britain and Europe. It has also been associated through the years with high literary connections. For example, David Hume in 1764 requested it from the bookseller Andrew Millar in a cheap format for a French friend.

Contents

First Part

The First Part's subtitle is a "Commentary upon Littleton", concerning land law and property law. Often called Coke on Littleton (abbreviated "Co. Litt."), it is a commentary on Thomas de Littleton's treatise on land tenure.

Second Part

The Second Part's subtitle is "Containing the Exposition of Many Ancient and Other Statutes", particularly Magna Carta.

Third Part

The Third Part's subtitle is "Concerning High Treason and other Please of the Crown and Criminal Causes".

Fourth Part
The Fourth Part's subtitle is "Concerning the Jurisdiction of the Courts".

See also
English land law
UK constitutional law
English contract law
Books of authority
Rule of law

Notes

External links

First editions
The Institutes of the Lawes of England are divided into four parts, the first editions of which are as follows:

. 
.
.
.

Selected later editions

Editions printed by Andrew Crooke, et al. (1669–1671).
.
.
.
Editions printed by John Streater, et al. (1670–1671).
.
.
.
.
Editions printed by William Rawlins, et al. (1680–1684).
.
.

.
.
15th edition (1794–1797).
. 3 vols.:
Volume I.
Volume II.
Volume III.
.
.
.
19th edition (1832).
.
.
1st American edition (1853), based on the 19th London edition.
.
.
2003 Liberty Fund edition. . 3 vols.
.
.
.

 

17th-century books
17th century in law
Legal history of England
Legal treatises
Works by Edward Coke
1628 books
1642 books
1644 books